Máel Brigte Ua Brolcháin was a medieval Irish bishop.

He was bishop of "Ard Macha" (Armagh) in the Annals of Ulster, but probably took care over the ee of Cinél nEógain. Brolcháin died on 29 January 1139.

References

People from County Londonderry
12th-century Roman Catholic bishops in Ireland
Bishops of Cinél nEógain
1139 deaths